The Naismith Memorial Basketball Hall of Fame is an American history museum and hall of fame for the sport of basketball.

Basketball Hall of Fame may also refer to:

 Australian Basketball Hall of Fame
 FIBA Hall of Fame in Alcobendas, Spain
 Finnish Basketball Hall of Fame
 French Basketball Hall of Fame
 Indiana Basketball Hall of Fame in New Castle, Indiana
 Italian Basketball Hall of Fame
 National Collegiate Basketball Hall of Fame in Kansas City, Missouri
 Philippine Basketball Association Hall of Fame
 Women's Basketball Hall of Fame in Knoxville, Tennessee